Group A of the 1992 Federation Cup Americas Zone was one of four pools in the Americas zone of the 1992 Federation Cup. Four teams competed in a round robin competition, with the top two teams advancing to the knockout stage.

Mexico vs. Trinidad and Tobago

Uruguay vs. El Salvador

Mexico vs. Uruguay

Trinidad and Tobago vs. El Salvador

Uruguay vs. Trinidad and Tobago

Mexico vs. El Salvador

See also
Fed Cup structure

References

External links
 Fed Cup website

1992 Federation Cup Americas Zone